"The Flame Breathers" is the 12th pulp magazine story to feature The Avenger. Written by Paul Ernst, it was published in the September 1, 1940 issue of The Avenger magazine. With this issue, The Avenger magazine switched to a bi-monthly schedule.

Publishing history
This novel was re-published under its original title by Paperback Library on May 1, 1973.

Summary

Four Polish scientists and a private detective become "Flame Breathers" and die; a car and a plane set speed records and are destroyed, the driver, pilot, and a reporter, killed; a Montreal police lab, the financier Singer's home, a bathtub with financier Henderlin in it all explode; a house in NJ, heated and lit without using electricity, gas, or oil, explodes. A beautiful woman with black hair thwarts the Justice Inc. team repeatedly. A small strange man seems to be implicated in the scheme. Benson initially finds no chemical explanation for the flames and explosions. He investigates, his aides playing relatively small roles. Benson is betrayed by his paralyzed face and his white hair. The plot is complex: two gangs, each backed by a financier, fight for control of a secret process, discovered by the four scientists, that can turn water into an energy source. The black-haired woman seeks justice for the death of the reporter, her brother, and gets it as Benson causes the gangs destroy one another. The small man, lab assistant to the four scientists, dies, taking the secret of getting energy from water to the grave with him.

Pulp stories
Works originally published in The Avenger (magazine)
1940 American novels